The Polish Women's Superliga, also known as the PGNiG Women's Superliga for sponsorship reasons, is the top women's handball league in Poland. The current champion is MKS Lublin

2021-22 teams

 JKS Jarosław
 Piotrcovia Piotrków Trybunalski
 EB Start Elbląg
 AZS Politechnika Koszalin
 MKS Lublin
 KPR Kobierzyce
 Kolporter Kielce
 Metraco Zagłębie Lubin

EHF league ranking
EHF League Ranking for 2022/23 season.

List of champions

 1939 - Znicz Łódź
 1946 - Zryw Łódź
 1947 - Zryw Łódź
 1948 - SKS Warszawa
 1949 - Unia Łódź
 1950 - Spójnia Warszawa
 1951 - Unia Łódź
 1952 - Unia Łódź
 1953 - not held
 1954 - not held
 1955 - Stal Chorzów
 1956 - Stal Chorzów
 1957 - Cracovia
 1958 - Cracovia
 1959 - AZS Katowice
 1960 - Cracovia
 1961 - Cracovia
 1962 - Ruch Chorzów
 1963 - Ruch Chorzów
 1964 - Ruch Chorzów
 1965 - Sośnica Gliwice
 1966 - Sośnica Gliwice
 1967 - Cracovia
 1968 - AZS Wrocław
 1969 - AZS Wrocław
 1970 - Otmęt Krapkowice
 1971 - Otmęt Krapkowice
 1972 - Sośnica Gliwice
 1973 - Ruch Chorzów
 1974 - Ruch Chorzów
 1975 - Ruch Chorzów
 1976 - AZS Wrocław
 1977 - Ruch Chorzów
 1978 - Ruch Chorzów
 1979 - AZS Wrocław
 1980 - Ruch Chorzów
 1981 - AKS Chorzów
 1982 - AKS Chorzów
 1983 - Pogoń Szczecin
 1984 - AZS Wrocław
 1985 - Cracovia
 1986 - Pogoń Szczecin
 1987 - Cracovia
 1988 - AKS Chorzów
 1989 - AZS Wrocław
 1990 - AZS Wrocław
 1991 - Pogoń Szczecin
 1992 - Start Elbląg
 1993 - Piotrcovia Piotrków Trybunalski
 1994 - Start Elbląg
 1995 - Montex Lublin
 1996 - Montex Lublin
 1997 - Montex Lublin
 1998 - Montex Lublin
 1999 - Montex Lublin
 2000 - Montex Lublin
 2001 - Montex Lublin
 2002 - Montex Lublin
 2003 - Pol-Skone Lublin
 2004 - AZS AWFiS Gdańsk
 2005 - SPR ICom Lublin
 2006 - SPR ICom Lublin
 2007 - SPR ICom Lublin
 2008 - SPR ICom Lublin
 2009 - SPR Asecco Lublin
 2010 - SPR Lublin
 2011 – KGHM Metraco Zagłębie Lubin
 2012 - Vistal Łączpol Gdynia
 2013 - SPR Lublin
 2014 - MKS Selgros Lublin
 2015 - MKS Selgros Lublin
 2016 - MKS Selgros Lublin
 2017 - GTPR Gdynia
 2018 - MKS Lublin
 2019 - MKS Lublin
 2020 - MKS Lublin
 2021 - Metraco Zagłębie Lubin
 2022 - Zagłębie Lubin

See also
 Superliga (men's handball)
 Handball in Poland
 Sports in Poland

References

External links
Official Website 

Women's handball in Poland
Women's handball leagues
Women's sports leagues in Poland
Professional sports leagues in Poland